Knob is used in the name of many geographical features:

Knob Creek can refer to any of several streams by that name
Knob Fork, West Virginia, an unincorporated community in Wetzel County, West Virginia, United States
Knob Hill, a neighborhood in central Colorado Springs, Colorado
Knob Hill, Alberta, municipal district in central Alberta, Canada, south of Edmonton
Knob Lake, the central lake in Three Lakes Valley in northeast Signy Island
Knob Lick, Casey County, Kentucky, unincorporated community in Casey County, Kentucky, United States
Knob Lick, Estill County, Kentucky, an unincorporated community in Estill County, Kentucky, United States
Knob Lick, Metcalfe County, Kentucky, an unincorporated community in Metcalfe County, Kentucky, United States
Knob Lick, Missouri, an unincorporated community in southern Saint Francois County, Missouri
Knob Mountain (Pennsylvania), a ridge in the northeastern part of Columbia County, Pennsylvania
Knob Mountain (Page County, Virginia), a mountain in Page County, Virginia
Knob Noster, Missouri, a city in Johnson County, Missouri, United States
Knob Point (Ross Island), a rounded coastal point on the west side of Hut Point Peninsula, Ross Island
Knob Point (South Sandwich Islands), the southwesternmost point of Vindication Island in the South Sandwich Islands
Knob, Arkansas, unincorporated community in Clay County, Arkansas
Knobs, West Virginia, an unincorporated community in Monroe County, West Virginia, United States
Knobs region, located in the US state of Kentucky
Knobs State Forest, a United States forest located in Bullitt County, Kentucky

A number of mountains and hills are described as knobs, as are their associated settlements:

A 
Artillery Knob, a mountain in the Cradle Mountain-Lake St Clair National Park in Tasmania, Australia

B 
Bake Oven Knob, a high point on the Blue Mountain Ridge of the Appalachian Mountains in Lehigh County, Pennsylvania
Baker Knob, a small rounded coastal elevation north of Harrison Nunatak at the east end of Thurston Island
Bald Knob, the highest summit of Back Allegheny Mountain in Pocahontas County, West Virginia
Bald Knob, Arkansas, a city in White County, Arkansas, United States
Bald Knob, Franklin County, VA, a summit located in Franklin County, Virginia
Bald Knob, West Virginia, an unincorporated community in Boone County, West Virginia, United States
Bald Knob Wilderness, a 5,973-acre parcel of land listed as a Wilderness Area of the United States
Barton Knob, a mountain summit located on Cheat Mountain in southeastern Randolph County, West Virginia
Beelick Knob, West Virginia, unincorporated community and coal town in Fayette County, West Virginia, United States
Bens Knob runs southwest northeast through Hampshire County in West Virginia's Eastern Panhandle
Benson Knob, a distinctive rocky hill at the south extremity of Ricker Hills in the Prince Albert Mountains, Victoria Land
Bickle Knob, a mountain summit located east of Elkins in Randolph County, West Virginia
Black Balsam Knob, in the Pisgah National Forest southwest of Asheville, NC
Black Knob, a big black rock outcrop west of Twin Crater on Hut Point Peninsula, Ross Island
Blue Knob (Pennsylvania), a Pennsylvania summit with a broad dome in the range of Allegheny Mountains
Blue Knob State Park, a 6,128-acre Pennsylvania state park in Kimmel, Lincoln
Brier Knob (Avery County, North Carolina), a mountain in the North Carolina High Country
Bryant Knob Formation, geologic formation in Missouri
Burnt Knob, 739 acre municipal park in Louisville, Kentucky, United States
Butler Knob, a peak on the Jacks Mountain ridge in south central Pennsylvania in the United States

C 
Celo Knob, the northernmost major peak in the Black Mountains of western North Carolina
Chestnut Knob, West Virginia, an unincorporated community in Mercer County, West Virginia, United States
Clarks Knob, a summit in Franklin County, Pennsylvania
Cox's Knob, neighborhood on the south side of Louisville, Kentucky, USA
Crossing Knob, a mountain in the North Carolina High Country, west from the community of Sugar Grove
Cuckoo's Knob, small village and civil parish in the Vale of Pewsey, Wiltshire, England

D 
Dick's Knob, the third-highest peak in the State of Georgia
Dorsey Knob, a mountain summit located at the southern edge of Morgantown in Monongalia County, West Virginia, United States
Double Spring Knob, the tenth-highest peak in Georgia, USA
Douglas Knob, an isolated mountain peak in the southwest section of Yellowstone National Park
Dowdell's Knob,  Georgia state park located near Pine Mountain and Warm Springs

E 
Ehlers Knob, a small but conspicuous ice-covered knob which surmounts the west part of the north coast of Dustin Island
Elk Knob (Watauga County, North Carolina), a mountain in the North Carolina High Country, north of the community of Meat Camp
Elliott Knob, one of the highest mountains in the northern portions of the U.S. state of Virginia

F 
Fairlies Knob National Park, a national park in Queensland, Australia, 231 km north of Brisbane
Floyds Knobs, Indiana, a small unincorporated town in Lafayette Township, Floyd County, Indiana
Frenchman Knob, summit in Hart County, Kentucky, in the United States

G 
Gap in Knob, Kentucky, unincorporated community located in Bullitt County, Kentucky, United States
Gaudineer Knob, a mountain summit on the Randolph/Pocahontas County line in eastern West Virginia, USA
Gobbler's Knob Fire Lookout, a fire lookout in the extreme western region of Mount Rainier National Park
Gobblers Knob, a succession of groundhogs in Punxsutawney, Pennsylvania
Grassy Knob Wilderness, a wilderness area in the Klamath Mountains of southwestern Oregon, within the Rogue River-Siskiyou National Forest
Grays Knob, Kentucky, unincorporated community and coal town in Harlan County, Kentucky, United States
Green River Knob, the tallest point in the Knobs region of Kentucky, USA

H 
Hairy Knob, summit in Mason County, Texas, in the United States
Harrison Knob, a small mountain in the Lower Mainland region of British Columbia, Canada
Hendersin Knob, an ice-covered knob rising between the heads of Craft and Rochray Glaciers in the southwest part of Thurston Island
Henry's Knob, a mountain and Superfund Alternative Site in York County South Carolina
High Knob, the peak of Stone Mountain, part of a large mountain, or massif, in Wise County, Virginia
High Knob (Blue Ridge, Virginia), a peak of the Blue Ridge Mountains in Warren and Fauquier county, Virginia
High Knob (West Virginia), a mountain summit on the border between Hampshire and Hardy counties in West Virginia's Eastern Panhandle
Howard Knob, a mountain in the North Carolina High Country, located in the town of Boone

I 
Iron Knob, South Australia, a town in South Australia on the Eyre Highway across Eyre Peninsula

J 
Jacks Knob, a mountain located on the border of Towns County and Union County, Georgia
Jacks Knob Trail, a hiking trail that has been designated as a National Recreation Trail in Georgia
Jeptha Knob, the highest point in the Bluegrass region of Kentucky
Junction Knob, a small but distinctive peak at the junction of Odin Glacier and Alberich Glacier neve areas in the Asgard Range, Victoria Land

K 
Keeney Knob, a mountain of the Ridge-and-Valley Appalachians in Summers County, West Virginia
Kentuck Knob, a residence designed by the American architect Frank Lloyd Wright in Pennsylvania, USA
Kinton Knob, a peak in Bedford County, Pennsylvania

L 
Lord Hereford's Knob, a mountain in south-east Wales, in the Black Mountains

M 
Marks Knob, a mountain in the Great Smoky Mountains, in the southeastern United States
McAfee Knob, feature of Catawba mountain in Catawba, Roanoke County, Virginia on the Appalachian Trail
Moore's Knob, the highest mountain in the Sauratown Mountains of Stokes County, North Carolina

N 
Nausea Knob, a prominent outcropping of jumbled rocks on the northwest upper slope of the active cone of Mount Erebus, Ross Island
Nicodemus Knob, rough, lozenge-shaped 30-feet pillar left at East Cliff on the Isle of Portland, Dorset, England
North Knob, the highest peak in eastern Pennsylvania, east of Susquehanna River

O 
Old Butt Knob, summit in Haywood County, North Carolina, in the United States

P 
Parnell Knob, a mountain in the Ridge and Valley Appalachians region of south central Pennsylvania
Penobscot Knob, a hill located near Mountain Top, Pennsylvania and Wilkes-Barre, Pennsylvania
Pilgrim's Knob, Virginia, an unincorporated community in Buchanan County, Virginia, United States
Pillow Knob, a peak protruding through the snow cover at the northeast end of Williams Hills in the Neptune Range, Pensacola Mountains
Pilot Knob, Indiana, an unincorporated community in Jennings Township, Crawford County, Indiana
Pilot Knob, Missouri, a city in Iron County, Missouri, United States
Pilot Knob, Texas, a small unincorporated community in southern Travis County, Texas, United States
Pilot Knob, Wisconsin, ghost town in the town of Richfield, Adams County, Wisconsin, United States
Pilot Knob (Austin, Texas), a hill that is part of an extinct volcano located seven miles south of central Austin, Texas
Pilot Knob (Imperial County, California), a peak in Imperial County, California
Pilot Knob (Iron County, Missouri), located in the Arcadia Valley of Iron County, Missouri
Pilot Knob Township, Washington County, Illinois, located in Washington County, Illinois
Pine Knob, a downhill ski area in Clarkston, Michigan
Pine Knob (Pennsylvania), a peak in the Allegheny Mountains of Pennsylvania
Pine Knob, Wisconsin, unincorporated community in the town of Utica, Crawford County, Wisconsin, United States
Pores Knob, a mountain peak located in Wilkes County, North Carolina
Purcell Knob, a spur of the Blue Ridge Mountain in Loudoun County, Virginia

Q

R 
Rattlesnake Knob, summit in Sauk County, Wisconsin, in the United States
Red Knob, Roane County, West Virginia, unincorporated community in Roane County, West Virginia
Reddish Knob of Shenandoah Mountain is one of the highest points in Virginia
Rich Knob, located in Towns County, Georgia
Ritchey Knob, a summit located on the Blue Knob massif
River Knobs (West Virginia), a ridge and series of knobs in western Pendleton County, West Virginia, USA
Roan High Knob, the highpoint of the Roan-Unaka Range of the Southern Appalachian Mountains
Rocky Knob (Georgia), eight different mountain peaks located in the North Georgia mountains
Rocky Knob AVA, an American Viticultural Area in a mountainous area east of the Blue Ridge Parkway in southwest Virginia
Roper's Knob Fortifications, constructed by Union Army forces between February and May 1863 in Franklin, Tennessee
Round Knob, Illinois, an unincorporated community in Massac County, Illinois, United States

S 
Scutchamer Knob, an early Iron Age round barrow on the Ridgeway National Trail at East Hendred Down in the English county of Oxfordshire
Shell Knob, Missouri, a census-designated place in Stone counties in the U.S. state of Missouri
Shell Knob Township, Barry County, Missouri, one of twenty-five townships in Barry County, Missouri, USA
Sidneys Knob, an atypical mountain for Pennsylvania
Signal Knob (Virginia), the northern peak of Massanutten Mountain in the Ridge and Valley Appalachians
Smith Knob, a partly snow-covered rock peak south-southeast of Mendenhall Peak in the east part of the Thiel Mountains
Spruce Knob, the highest point in the state of West Virginia and the summit of Spruce Mountain, the tallest mountain in the Alleghenies
Stark's Knob, a basaltic pillow lava formation near Schuylerville, New York, United States
Stuart Knob, mountain located within Banff National Park in the Canadian Rockies
Stuffley Knob (Johnson County, Kentucky), the tallest mountain in Johnson County, Kentucky
Sugar Tree Knob, Tennessee, unincorporated community in Cannon County, Tennessee, United States
Sugarloaf Knob, a well-known summit within Ohiopyle State Park on the south end of the Laurel Ridge

T 
The Knob (Indiana) (elevation ) is the fourth highest point in the U.S. state of Indiana
The Knob (South Georgia), a conspicuous dome-shaped rock, 40 m high, at the west side of Elsehul on the north coast of South Georgia
Tomkins Knob, a mountain in the North Carolina High Country, near the community of Deep Gap
Tricorner Knob, a mountain in the Great Smoky Mountains, located in the Southeastern United States
Trimble Knob, located southwest of Monterey, VA, in Highland County, is a conical hill
Trischman Knob, an isolated summit along the Continental Divide on the Madison Plateau in Yellowstone National Park
Turkey Knob, West Virginia, unincorporated community and coal town in Fayette County, West Virginia, United States
Twelve O'clock Knob (Roanoke County, Virginia), a mountain located in southwestern Roanoke County, Virginia

U

V 
Ventifact Knobs, minor knobs located just east of Lake Bonney in Taylor Valley, Victoria Land

W 
Walsh Knob, a small but distinctive ice-covered elevation that rises midway along the south side of Lofgren Peninsula in east Thurston Island
Waterrock Knob, a mountain peak in the U.S. state of North Carolina
Webster Knob, a prominent rock knob at the head of Strom Glacier in the Queen Maud Mountains
Weed Patch Knob, the third highest summit in the U.S. state of Indiana
White Knob Formation, geologic formation in Idaho
White Knob, Idaho, ghost town in Custer County, Idaho
Woody's Knob, a summit or "knob" in the Blue Ridge Mountains in Mitchell County, North Carolina

Y 
Yorkeys Knob, Queensland, one of the beach suburbs of Cairns, the regional capital of Far North Queensland, Australia
Young Lick Knob, a mountain that lies in three Georgia counties, Habersham, Rabun and Towns

Z

See also
Knob Creek (bourbon), a brand of Kentucky straight bourbon whiskey produced by Beam Inc. at the Jim Beam distillery in Clermont, Kentucky
Knob mudalia, a species of freshwater snail in the family Pleuroceridae
Knob-billed duck, an unusual, pan-tropical duck
Knob-billed fruit dove, a species of bird in the family Columbidae
Dorset Knob, a hard dry savoury biscuit made by Moores Biscuits, in the county of Dorset in England
Expert Knob Twiddlers, an ambient-techno album by Mike Paradinas and Richard D. James
Hip-knob, in architecture, is the finial on the hip of a roof, between the barge-boards of a gable
"Insert Knob A In Hole B", a science fiction short story by Isaac Asimov

Disambiguation pages
Knob (disambiguation)
The Knob (disambiguation)

Geography-related lists